Walsh is an unincorporated community in Randolph County, Illinois, United States. Walsh has a post office with ZIP code 62297.

References

Unincorporated communities in Randolph County, Illinois
Unincorporated communities in Illinois